Hermann Betschart (19 December 1910 – 30 June 1950) was a Swiss rower who competed in the 1936 Summer Olympics. In 1936 he was a crew member of the Swiss boat which won the silver medal in the coxed fours event. As part of the Swiss boat in the coxless fours competition he won the bronze medal. He also participated in the eight event where the Swiss boat finished sixth.

References

 

1910 births
1950 deaths
Swiss male rowers
Olympic rowers of Switzerland
Rowers at the 1936 Summer Olympics
Olympic silver medalists for Switzerland
Olympic bronze medalists for Switzerland
Olympic medalists in rowing
Medalists at the 1936 Summer Olympics
European Rowing Championships medalists